A militia is an army or other fighting organization of non-professional soldiers.

Militia may also refer to:

Military and other organizations

United Kingdom
 Militia (British Dominions and Crown Colonies), the principal forces of the Dominions, Self-governing colonies, and Crown Colonies of the British Empire
 Militia (English), pre-18th century military obligations and militia forces in England
 Militia (Great Britain), the principal reserve forces of the Kingdom of Great Britain during the 18th century
 Militia (United Kingdom), the reserve forces of the United Kingdom of Great Britain and Ireland after the Union in 1801

Elsewhere
 Bosnian militia (Ottoman), a military unit indigenous to Bosnia serving as a provincial army to the Ottoman Empire
 Militia (China), part of the military forces of China
 Militia (Italian neo-Nazi group)
 Militia (United States), various forces in the United States, from the colonial era to the present day
 Militsiya, the police forces in the Soviet Union (until 1991) and in several Eastern Bloc countries, including: 
 Miliția (Romania), the police force of Communist Romania 1949–1989
 Militia (Yugoslavia), a law enforcement agency of the Socialist Federal Republic of Yugoslavia 1944–1992

Other uses
 Militia (video game), or Metal Marines, a 1993 real-time strategy game

See also